George Lindsay may refer to:

 George C. Lindsay (1855–1945), American classical guitarist
 George Campbell Lindsay (1863–1905), Scottish rugby union international
 George Edmund Lindsay (1916–2002), American botanist and museum director
 George H. Lindsay (George Henry Lindsay, 1837–1916), U.S. Representative from New York
 George W. Lindsay (George Washington Lindsay, 1865–1938), his son, U.S. Representative from New York
 George Lindsay (British Army officer) (1880–1956)
 George Broun-Lindsay (1888–1964), also known as George Lindsay, Scottish Unionist MP for Glasgow Partick, 1924–1929
 George Lindsay, 3rd Lord Spynie (died 1671), Scottish nobleman

See also
 George Lindsey (1928–2012), American actor
 George Lindsay-Crawford, 22nd Earl of Crawford (1758–1808), Scottish peer and soldier